F41 may refer to:

 F41 (classification), a disability sport classification
 F-41 (Michigan county highway)
 , a Niterói-class frigate of the Brazilian Navy
 Ennis Municipal Airport, in Ellis County, Texas
 Farman F.41, a French reconnaissance aircraft
 , a V-class destroyer of the Royal Navy
 , a Nilgiri-class frigate of the Indian Navy
 Samsung Galaxy F41, a smartphone